Corinth is an unincorporated community in Jones County, Texas, United States. The community had a population of 25 from 1940 to 1990 and a population of 10 in 2000.

References

Unincorporated communities in Jones County, Texas
Unincorporated communities in Texas